Elymnias obnubila is a butterfly in the family Nymphalidae. It was described by Lionel de Nicéville and George Frederick Leycester Marshall in 1883. It is endemic to Burma in the Indomalayan realm.

References

External links
"Elymnias Hübner, 1818" at Markku Savela's Lepidoptera and Some Other Life Forms

Elymnias
Butterflies described in 1883